Twin Beech AME Zion Church, listed as Twin Beach AME Church, is a historic African Methodist Episcopal church on the east side of CR 44 in Fairhope, Alabama.  It was built in 1925 and added to the National Register of Historic Places in 1988.

References

Methodist churches in Alabama
Churches on the National Register of Historic Places in Alabama
National Register of Historic Places in Baldwin County, Alabama
Churches completed in 1925
Churches in Baldwin County, Alabama
African Methodist Episcopal Zion churches in Alabama